Strode may refer to:

Strode (surname)
Strode's College, a sixth form college located in Egham, Surrey
Strode College, a tertiary institution and further education college situated in Street, Somerset, England
Strode Theatre, a small theatre and cinema within Strode College
Strode House, a historic landmark in Tuscaloosa, Alabama
The verb, strode, the past tense of stride, a form of gait

See also
Strode's case, one of the earliest and most important English cases dealing with parliamentary privilege
Privilege of Parliament Act 1512, commonly known as Strode's Act, passed in response to the case
Laurie Strode, a fictional character from the Halloween film series